Phyllonorycter ipomoellus is a moth   of the family Gracillariidae. It is found in south-western Rwanda in open clearings in montane wet forests at an altitude of about 1,800 meters.

The length of the forewings is 2.71–2.82 mm. The forewing ground colour is ochreous with white markings. The hindwings are pale grey with slight bronze shading and shine and with a long fringe of the same shading as the hindwing. Adults are on wing in mid-August.

The larvae feed as leaf miners on Ipomoea bracteata.  The mine is small, tentiform, and made on the underside of the leaf, usually on the subbasal part. There may be one or two mines present on a single leaf.

Etymology
The specific name is derived from the generic name of the host plant, Ipomoea.

References

Moths described in 2012
ipomoellus
Moths of Africa

Taxa named by Jurate de Prins
Leaf miners
Lepidoptera of Rwanda